Katina P was a Greek oil tanker carrying 72,000 tonnes of oil which sank off the Mozambique coast on 26 April 1992.

Sinking
The tanker, which had been under way from Venezuela to the Persian Gulf, had lost a hull plate during a storm. Two of the vessel's tanks had ruptured and spilled some 13,000 tonnes of #6 heavy fuel oil in the Mozambique Channel. A further 3,000 tonnes leaked from the ship while it was aground.

The South African tugboat , was contracted by the firm Pentow Marine to tow the crippled tanker into the Mozambique Channel where the remaining oil would be transferred to another tanker. It is not clear why the oil transfer was not done at an early stage of the tow, as time was of the essence. The south-moving Agulhas current spread the spilled oil into Maputo Bay, the estuaries of Incomati and Matola rivers, mangrove swamps of Montanhana and Catembe, beaches of Catembe, Polana, Costa do Sol and Bairro dos Pescadores, Xefinas Island, and many more with disastrous environmental and socio-economic effects.

Compensation of $10.7 million was claimed, but finally only $4.5 million was paid to the Mozambique government. Mozambique's lack of expertise in maritime claims and its not being a member of the International Maritime Organization were cited as reasons for the small compensation figure. The payment had consequently been made in terms of the voluntary compensation scheme operated by the oil industry itself, and known as TOVALOP. Investigations following the disaster revealed considerable negligence on the part of the owners and the captain of Katina P. The unseaworthy tanker had been scheduled for demolition, and was on its way from Rio de Janeiro to Bangladesh where it was to be broken up. While crossing the Atlantic it was instructed to put about and load fuel oil in Venezuela destined for Fujirah in the United Arab Emirates.

Some 5,000 tankers per year were being routed through the Mozambique Channel in 1999. Of these, 1,200 were Very Large Crude Carriers, each carrying at least 200,000 tonnes. Along this vulnerable stretch of coastline there is no contingency plan for marine pollution, nor is there legislation covering compensation for spill damage.

Other uses
The name Katina P was also used for a Greek cargo steamer of 1,216 tons built in 1900 by Mackie & Thomson of Govan, and named Roman.  In 1906 she was renamed Prince Leopold of Belgique and in 1923 Anastasios. In 1927 she was renamed L. Fafalios and in 1929 Maria. In 1939 she was renamed Katina P for G.J. Papayannakis of Piraeus in Greece. On 7 May 1941, during the German invasion of Greece, she was bombed and sunk by German aircraft at Astakos, Greece.

See also 
 List of oil spills

References

Oil tankers
Shipwrecks of Africa
Maritime incidents in 1992